The Somerset Patriots are an American Minor League Baseball team based in Bridgewater Township, New Jersey, that is the Double-A affiliate of the New York Yankees. They compete in the Eastern League, known as the Double-A Northeast in 2021, and were previously members of the independent Atlantic League of Professional Baseball from 1998 to 2020. The Patriots have played their home games at TD Bank Ballpark since 1999.

The Patriots were the winningest franchise of the Atlantic League, capturing six championship series titles in 2001, 2003, 2005, 2008, 2009, and 2015. Their most recent playoff appearance was in 2018 when they lost in the semifinals against the Long Island Ducks.

The "Patriots" name refers to the Middlebrook encampment where the first official flag of the United States was unfurled, after a law to adopt a national flag had been passed by Congress on June 14, 1777. By special order of Congress, a 13-star flag is flown 24 hours a day at the Washington Camp Ground, part of the former Middlebrook encampment, in Bridgewater Township.

History

The Somerset Patriots were one of the founding members of the Atlantic League in 1998. However, the team spent its inaugural season as a road team while TD Bank Park was being constructed. In the 1999 season, the Patriots opened their ballpark, where they quickly became one of the most successful franchises of the league in both the win and attendance columns.

For spring training in 2009, the Somerset Patriots became the first Atlantic League team to hold its spring training in its own locale, at the Jack Cust Baseball Academy in nearby Flemington, instead of the traditional site in Lakeland, Florida.  The Lancaster Barnstormers and the York Revolution followed suit in 2009, primarily because of the 2008 economic recession.

The Somerset Patriots, and then manager Sparky Lyle, won their 1,000th game on July 24, 2012. The Patriots defeated the Sugar Land Skeeters with a score of 6–5, in the day game of a day/night doubleheader.

On November 27, 2012, it was announced Somerset's pitching coach and former major league pitcher, Brett Jodie, would become the new manager with Lyle becoming manager emeritus.

Former professional football player Donald Jones briefly played for the Patriots during his recovery from a kidney transplant.

In November 2020, the Patriots were announced as the new Double-A affiliate of the New York Yankees, replacing the Trenton Thunder. They were organized into the Double-A Northeast. Somerset began competition in the new league as a Yankees affiliate on May 4 with a 6–0 victory over the Harrisburg Senators at TD Bank Ballpark. They won the 2021 Northeast Division title with a first-place 72–47 record. Despite winning the division, their record was third-best in the league, and only the two teams with the highest winning percentages in the regular season competed for the league championship. Oswaldo Cabrera won the league's Most Valuable Award. In 2022, the Double-A Northeast became known as the Eastern League, the name historically used by the regional circuit prior to the 2021 reorganization.

Season-by-season results

Logos and uniforms

The Somerset Patriots' official colors are navy blue, maroon, and silver.  The primary logo depicts a Continental soldier in navy blue with white stars on his shoulder and maroon stripes flowing to his left, a reference to the U.S. flag.  Centered below the soldier is the wordmark in navy blue underlined by a silver baseball bat outlined in navy blue.  The word "Somerset" is centered above the wordmark in maroon.

The Patriots wear caps and uniforms produced by New Era.  The caps are navy blue throughout with the cap logo centered on the front.  The cap logo consists of the Continental soldier's head outlined in white and maroon.  The Patriots also have an alternate cap that has a navy blue crown with a maroon brim and button.  The cap logo on the alternate cap consists of a scripted "S" in maroon with a white outline and the Patriot-head cap logo superimposed.  The home jersey includes pinstripes and the "Patriots" wordmark centered across the front in navy blue and maroon.  The away jersey resembles the New York Yankees' away jersey with the "Somerset" wordmark.  The belt, socks, and undershirt are navy blue.

The Patriots' alternate jersey is navy blue.  The "Patriots" wordmark is centered on the chest in maroon with a white outline, and a white star in the underscore.

Radio and television

All of the Patriots' games are broadcast on WCTC, as well as MiLB.TV with the voice of the Patriots, Steven Cusamano.

Mascots

One of the Somerset Patriots' official mascots is an anthropomorphic dog named Sparkee.  He wears the team's home uniform with white sneakers.  The mascot debuted on July 11, 1998, at the Atlantic League's first All-Star Game at Bernie Robbins Stadium in Atlantic City.  Sparkee's name refers to the Patriots' first manager, Sparky Lyle.  The team also employs another character, a cat (according to Somerset Patriots staff (sometimes mistaken for a bear)) named Slider.  After training with Sparkee for several months, he debuted in the 2007 season.  Slider wears the Patriots' navy blue alternate jersey with gray pants.  The team had a mascot named "TD" (after the stadium's sponsor) debuted in the June 30, 2010, game against the Camden Riversharks. Also, the team had a live mascot known as "General Admission" who wears the traditional uniform donned by those fighting for the colonies during the American Revolution complete with the three-cornered hat and musket.

Roster

Retired numbers
 28 (Sparky Lyle) Manager, Retired by the Patriots on June 14, 2014
 42 (Jackie Robinson) Second baseman, Retired throughout professional baseball on April 15, 1997

References

External links
 

 
1998 establishments in New Jersey
Baseball teams established in 1998
Baseball teams in the New York metropolitan area
Bridgewater Township, New Jersey
Eastern League (1938–present) teams
Former Atlantic League of Professional Baseball teams
New York Yankees minor league affiliates
Professional baseball teams in New Jersey
Double-A Northeast teams